Norman Osborn is a character portrayed by Willem Dafoe in Sam Raimi's Spider-Man film trilogy and later temporarily integrated into the Marvel Cinematic Universe (MCU) media franchise. He is based on the Marvel Comics character of the same name and is also known by his villainous alternate identity, the Green Goblin. Osborn first appeared in Spider-Man (2002) as a wealthy industrialist who tests an unstable performance-enhancing serum on himself, developing superhuman strength and a crazed alternate personality. He becomes the Green Goblin and fights the crime-fighter Spider-Man, but ultimately dies when he is impaled by his own glider.

The character returns in Spider-Man: No Way Home (2021) when a spell gone wrong ruptures the multiverse and sends him to an alternate reality. Osborn seeks that reality's Peter Parker's help in curing himself and the other universe-displaced visitors, but his mind is taken over by the Green Goblin, who torments Parker and kills his aunt May. After a duel with Parker on the Statue of Liberty, Osborn is cured of the Green Goblin identity and returned to his universe.

A hallucination of Osborn appears in Spider-Man 2 (2004) and Spider-Man 3 (2007), haunting his son Harry. Dafoe's portrayal has been praised by critics and audiences, being considered one of the most iconic villains in superhero films. Dafoe and Spider-Man actor Tobey Maguire held the Guinness World Record for "the longest career as a live-action Marvel character", until this record was broken less than six months after Spider-Man: No Way Home by Patrick Stewart's reprisal of his role as Professor Charles Xavier in Doctor Strange in the Multiverse of Madness (2022), 21 years and 296 days after his first appearance as the character in 2000's X-Men.

Concept and creation 
The Green Goblin was originally  created by writer Stan Lee and artist Steve Ditko, first appearing in The Amazing Spider-Man #14 (July 1964) as a character without a human identity unlike other Spider-Man villains, but the issue had suggested his identity would be revealed in the future; the Goblin revealed himself as Norman Osborn at the end of The Amazing Spider-Man #39 (June 1966), the first of a two-part story arc. The Goblin became one of Spider-Man's most popular enemies during the 1960s and was eventually killed off in the second part of "The Night Gwen Stacy Died" storyline (July 1973). The character resurfaces in The Clone Saga and has been adapted into other media separate from comics.

While rewriting Spider-Man (2002) from James Cameron's original "scriptment", David Koepp added the Green Goblin as well as the character Doctor Octopus as a secondary antagonist. Director Sam Raimi felt the Green Goblin and the surrogate father-son theme between Norman Osborn and Peter Parker in the then-recent Ultimate Marvel comics was much more interesting than adding "a third complex origin story" to the film, so Doctor Octopus was removed by Scott Rosenberg (who was hired to rewrite Koepp's material) and eventually became the antagonist of Spider-Man 2 (2004).

After being cast, Willem Dafoe concentrated on Osborn due to his belief that the Goblin was an aspect of Osborn and already made by external things like his costume and the film's special effects. Dafoe explained that Osborn was "a very complex character on the page", and that he could relate to him due to "[his] ambition and his desire for perfection and how that perverts so much of his relationship to people". During promotion for Spider-Man, Dafoe came up for an idea to reintroduce Osborn via a hallucination of him haunting his son Harry, which he compared to the ghost of Hamlet's father; he played the hallucination in Spider-Man 2 and Spider-Man 3 (2007).

Spider-Man: No Way Home 

Chris McKenna and Erik Sommers began exploring the idea of the multiverse and potentially revisiting characters from past Spider-Man films while writing the Marvel Cinematic Universe (MCU) film Spider-Man: No Way Home (2021). The duo ultimately decided to fully integrate the characters into the film and worked hard to prevent No Way Home from being "fan service" by using the returning characters to progress Peter Parker's (portrayed by Tom Holland) story. Osborn / Goblin was originally not the main villain of the film despite appearing as an antagonist, but was later realized that, after the film lost "other characters", McKenna and Sommers "had to" have him as the villain and rewrote the script to give him a second chance to replicate his actions in Spider-Man, but in a darker way related to Holland's Spider-Man. Goblin would have fought alongside Otto Octavius / Doctor Octopus (portrayed by Alfred Molina) against Spider-Man in a scene on the Alexander Hamilton Bridge; Goblin's introduction was moved into a climactic explosion with his pumpkin bombs, not engaging with Octavius or Spider-Man—but does encounter them.

Dafoe felt that the Green Goblin had advanced from his original portrayal and that Osborn and the Goblin had "a few more tricks up [their] sleeves" in No Way Home. Dafoe was digitally de-aged in order to replicate his 2002 likeness. To prevent his appearance in the film from leaking, Dafoe was required to wear cloaks around set with Holland learning of his involvement in the film by meeting him for the first time after accidentally bumping into him. Green Goblin was confirmed to be in the film in the official teaser released in August 2021, with Dafoe confirmed in the official trailer released in November.

Casting 

After John Malkovich turned down the opportunity to take the role, Dafoe was cast as Osborn / Goblin in November 2000; Kevin Spacey would have portrayed the Goblin in Cameron's unproduced Spider-Man film.

Raimi contacted Dafoe while the latter was filming in Spain and described the film's story to him in "such incredible psychological detail", talking about the relationships without the Spider-Man (portrayed by Tobey Maguire)–Goblin story. Dafoe realized that Raimi was "not cynical about this story", deeply loving the characters and feeling "an obligation as a Spider-Man fan to present these characters truthfully". Dafoe was initially hesitant to reprise the role, but was more open when producer Amy Pascal and director Jon Watts pitched No Way Home to him before he had received a script; he described this as "the same, but different". A rematch between Osborn and Maguire's Spider-Man was considered during the filming of No Way Home, but was ultimately cut by the film's release.

Characterization and themes 

Dafoe particularly enjoys the "mirror scene" depicting Osborn's conversation with the Goblin identity after murdering the Oscorp board of directors; before filming the scene with Dafoe, Raimi gave him a copy of Jekyll and Hyde to prepare for the scene, which filmed in one take multiple times before Raimi split it. Dafoe further differentiated the two identities by wearing dental prosthetics providing Osborn's straight teeth, and using his natural crooked teeth when portraying the Goblin.

Norman Osborn is portrayed as a workaholic scientist–businessman with a complicated relationship with his son Harry, being a career-focused man who prioritizes science, business, and success and is quite disappointed with Harry. The Green Goblin is subsequently created through Osborn's exposure to gas, being portrayed as a violent, sadistic, and unhinged psychopath that believes his powers place him above normal people, attempting to recruit Spider-Man into joining him.

The Goblin was introduced in early Spider-Man comics as an alternate identity separate from Osborn, which was adapted to the films; however, later comics would depict the Goblin as a costumed alias used by Osborn to commit his villainous deeds.

Thematic analysis 
Gizmodo James Whitbrook contrasts Maguire's Peter Parker / Spider-Man with Osborn / Goblin and James Franco's Harry Osborn in the way they choose to exercise their power in the film series, as he notes Parker, Osborn, and Harry appear to hold some form of power. While Parker learns the responsibility with his powers, Osborn gives into fear of losing his position within Oscorp, choosing to pursue an alternate power in the Goblin, attacking his former colleagues and the people he cares about, namely Harry and Parker, while descending further into madness and insanity. Adam Rosenberg from Mashable opined that Dafoe "owned every single one of his scenes" as he "charted Osborn's experimental serum-fueled descent into madness", and that the actor's voice sounded similar to what a reader would hear in their head when reading a comic book villain's speech bubbles.

The Goblin was felt by Oliver Vandervoort of Game Rant as "a bit more sinister" in No Way Home compared to his original portrayal, with the character being "a little darker and a little more dangerous" in the film. Praising the decision to have the character maskless in No Way Home, James Troughton at The Gamer called Dafoe's facial expressions "viscerally unsettling", going from a "lost old man desperate for help" to an unhinged killer "as easy as slipping on a pair of gloves", crediting this as giving a slasher edge to a superhero film. Writing for Screen Rant, Jake Gleason credits No Way Home with revealing Osborn as the "most tragic character" in the Spider-Man films by showing his kindness in interactions with Holland's Parker, May Parker, and Octavius as himself. Osborn's reactions to the Goblin's crimes are cited by Gleason as "proof that he is not evil" despite being an "imperfect" father to Harry and letting his "arrogant ambitions spiral out of control".

Design 

Amalgamated Dynamics created the original Goblin animatronic headgear for Spider-Man. The suit was originally designed much more faithfully to the comics, allowed for a full range of emotions to be expressed by the wearer, was scrapped after the concept was deemed "too creepy" by studio executives and due to technical difficulties and time constraints. Dafoe insisted on wearing the new, uncomfortable costume as he felt that a stuntman would not convey the character's necessary body language. The 580-piece suit took half an hour to put on. Costume designer James Acheson said that Dafoe told him that he wanted the costume to be flexible enough for him to do splits, further explaining that Dafoe was a yogi and "probably the most flexible actor [Acheson] ever worked with". When they started designing the costume, there was only a puppet of the design and they "picked out the major points where [they] would be hooking wires up to a harness under the costume", which became the basis from which they could lift him from his back or hips as well as do "several different things on wires". Acheson also experimented with a potential helmet-like design for the suit, which was then scrapped.

In No Way Home, the character obtains upgrades to his costume which make him more closely resemble his comic book counterpart. The Goblin first appears wearing his 2002 costume before the mask is destroyed by Osborn. The upgraded costume is depicted with a purple undersuit beneath the green armor with the Goblin wearing goggles and incorporating the retractable blades from his glider into his left gauntlet. Screen Rant Dan Zinski described the suit as tattered and noted the goal of the MCU's costume designs is "to find some middle ground" between the comic book version and the "more realistic".

Fictional character biography 
Dr. Norman Osborn is a scientist and the founder of Oscorp Industries, doubling as CEO for the company. He is the father of Harry Osborn, with whom he has a strained relationship. Fellow scientist Otto Octavius's work was funded by Osborn via Oscorp, but he was considered greedy and misguided by Octavius. During a school field trip, Osborn is introduced to Harry's best friend Peter Parker, whose intelligence impresses him.

Becoming the Green Goblin 

After meeting Parker, Osborn returns to Oscorp and hears Dr. Mendel Stromm reveal to military officials overseeing a super-soldier serum project that some test subjects have gone insane; Osborn is threatened with a tight deadline and decides to experiment on himself. An alternate, crazed personality–the "Green Goblin"–of Osborn is developed by the process, who kills Stromm and the military officials and Quest Aerospace scientists present at the super-soldier test. However, Quest expands and assumes control of Oscorp, requesting Osborn to step down as CEO. During a festival in Times Square, the Green Goblin kills the Oscorp board of directors, encountering Spider-Man in the festival. The Green Goblin leads his next attack at the Daily Bugle editor-in-chief J. Jonah Jameson for who takes pictures of Spider-Man. Spider-Man appears at the Bugle, but is kidnapped by the Green Goblin, who offers him a partnership and belittles his choice to become a hero, warning that the city will eventually turn against him. The Green Goblin baits Spider-Man to a burning apartment, asking if he accepted his offer, but Spider-Man refuses to partner with him.

After Thanksgiving dinner with Parker, his aunt May, Harry, and his girlfriend Mary Jane Watson, Osborn deduces Parker is Spider-Man, prompting the Green Goblin to attack and hospitalize May, and kidnap Watson. The Green Goblin makes Spider-Man choose whether to save Watson or a Roosevelt Island Tramway car full of children, but he saves both. The Green Goblin lands in an abandoned building and brutally beats Spider-Man, but is counterattacked. The Green Goblin thinks to fool Parker by unmasking himself as Osborn, with Osborn stating that Parker was like a son to him while the Green Goblin attempts to impale Parker with the glider. The latter dodges, causing the glider to fatally stab Osborn, who tells Parker not to tell Harry about the Green Goblin's actions as he dies.

Harry's hallucinations 

At Osborn's funeral, Harry mourns the loss, vowing vengeance on Spider-Man after witnessing him with his father's body; Otto Octavius states at some point following his death, Osborn's identity as the Green Goblin and death are widely reported on. Two years later, Harry discovers Parker's identity as Spider-Man and is haunted by a hallucination of Osborn demanding to be avenged, but the hallucination's mirror is broken by Harry, who discovers a hidden lair containing Green Goblin's arsenal. Harry becomes the "New Goblin" a year later, with Osborn re-appearing to remind Harry to avenge him and to go after Parker's heart. Harry eventually learns the truth about Osborn's death and gives up his vendetta against Spider-Man, sacrificing himself to save Parker.

Entering an alternate reality 

In the alternate reality of Earth-616, Dr. Stephen Strange casts a spell to erase people's memories of Peter Parker (later nicknamed "Peter-One")'s identity as Spider-Man after it was revealed by Mysterio. However, Peter-One's frequent alterations causes the spell to bring in people from across the multiverse who knew Parker's identity, including Osborn, who was taken from sometime after he had deduced his Spider-Man's identity. The Green Goblin encounters Peter-One and Octavius at the Alexander Hamilton Bridge.

Osborn retakes control and breaks the Green Goblin's mask in an alley, seeking refuge in F.E.A.S.T. after seeing an ad for Spider-Man there. Osborn meets the alternate May Parker, who calls in Peter-One; Osborn realizes that Peter-One is not his Parker, but goes with him to the New York Sanctum to its undercroft. Osborn learns of the multiverse and reunites with Octavius, but learns from Flint Marko that they both died during their final fight with Spider-Man. Osborn is then imprisoned by Strange, who prepares to use the Macchina de Kadavus to send him and the other villains back to meet their fates but is later released after Peter-One traps Strange in the Mirror Dimension, taking his box. Osborn then works with Peter-One to cure himself, Octavius, Marko, Curt Connors, and Max Dillon.

After Peter-One cures Octavius, the Green Goblin retakes control of Osborn's mind and turns on Peter-One, convincing Dillon and Marko to reject their cures and escape, engaging in a duel with him across Happy Hogan's apartment. In the lobby, the Green Goblin summons his glider and throws pumpkin bombs, causing the apartment to explode. The glider fatally strikes May before he escapes. After Marko, Dillon, and Connors are cured with Octavius help, the Green Goblin appears and destroys a contained spell–which had previously caused him, Octavius, and the latters to transport from their universes–from its original caster Doctor Strange; the destruction causes the barriers between universes to break, prompting Strange to try to seal them. An enraged Peter-One nearly kills the Green Goblin but is stopped by an older version of Osborn's Parker (nicknamed "Peter-Two"), whom the Green Goblin stabs. Another version of Parker (nicknamed "Peter-Three"), throws Peter-One a cure Parker developed which he injects the Green Goblin with, restoring him to a remorseful Norman Osborn. Afterwards, Strange casts a spell to make the alternate reality forget Peter-One's existence, causing Osborn, Parker, Octavius, and Marko to return to their universe.

In other media 
 Norman Osborn / Green Goblin appears in the video game adaptation of the first film, Spider-Man (2002), with Dafoe reprising his role from the film.
 The video game Spider-Man: Friend or Foe (2007) explores an alternate timeline where the Spider-Man film villains survived their deaths–including Osborn / Goblin (voiced by Roger L. Jackson), who becomes playable in the game.

Reception and legacy 

Dafoe's performance has been praised by critics and audiences, with Dafoe himself calling the role one of his favorite parts to play, having particularly enjoyed portraying the unhinged character due to his dual personalities and his balance between a dramatic and comedic performance. Dafoe's No Way Home co-stars Holland, Jamie Foxx, and Andrew Garfield praised his performance as well as his cackle; Foxx had also called his Green Goblin performance "terrifying" and "personal". Holland and his MCU Spider-Man films co-star Jacob Batalon called Goblin "a landmark villain", praising Dafoe's ability "to bring a difficult character to life" and particularly the mirror scene, before filming No Way Home; Holland had believed the Goblin "[was] difficult to pull off in live-action" in August 2019, a year before his praises with Batalon.

A New York Daily News reviewer felt Dafoe put the "scare in archvillain", and Peter Bradshaw of The Guardian deemed him "strong support"; Conversely, critic A. O. Scott of The New York Times wrote that Dafoe's performance was "uninspired and secondhand". While reviewing the films in April 2007, IGN Richard George commented that Green Goblin's armor, particularly the helmet, was "almost comically bad... Not only is it not frightening, it prohibits expression". Steven Scaife at Vice wrote that Dafoe's Goblin "represents everything that’s fun about superhero villains, as well as everything that’s great about Raimi's campy films", also commending Dafoe's voice and body language, which helped overcome the bulky Green Goblin costume that he compared to that of a Power Rangers villain. Dafoe's Goblin is acclaimed as one of the greatest superhero film villains, with Vulture ranking the character 19th on the top 25 superhero film villains in 2018, while Collider ranked him the 5th greatest Spider-Man film villain in 2020.

The Lantern Brett Price wrote that Dafoe was "on another level" in No Way Home and not having his mask made him even more intimidating than he was in the 2002 film. Peter Travers of Good Morning America and Jade King at The Gamer praised Dafoe and Molina, with King asserting that the two "stole the show as Green Goblin and Doc Ock" and described the depictions as brilliant. Amelia Emberwing of IGN praised the performances of Dafoe, Molina, and Foxx in No Way Home, while Vulture Bilge Ebiri said Dafoe "once again gets to have some modest fun with his character's divided self".

Legacy 
After Spider-Man had joined the MCU and Sony Pictures partnered with Marvel Studios to co-produce Spider-Man films, Pascal spoke in August 2016 of an attempt to differentiate the new Spider-Man films from previous ones, citing the Goblin's exclusion, "I mean, I don't know how many more times we can do – at least for now – I don't know how many more times we can do the Green Goblin. I've certainly tried to do it fifty". Similarly, Marvel Studios president Kevin Feige reflected that the MCU Spider-Man films chose to not reuse Spider-Man characters or elements, outside of the major ones, that were already adapted in previous Sony films, saying "it never occurred to us to do a new Goblin story, or to do an Oscorp story, or to do Doc Ock, or anyone that had been done before".

Osborn's line "you know, I'm something of a scientist myself", which became an internet meme in the years preceding the release of No Way Home, was reprised during the film. Screen Rant Dustin Brewer claimed the "sparing" use of Goblin in Spider-Man influenced the usage of villains in later superhero films such as the Joker in The Dark Knight (2008), furthering that this approach enables villains to "come and go more sporadically, giving them the ability to cause maximum mayhem every time they come on screen".

Accolades 

Dafoe has received several nominations, mostly in a "Best Villain" category, for his portrayal of Norman Osborn / Green Goblin; Dafoe's only win was a Critics' Choice Super Award in 2022 for his No Way Home performance. Separate from their film accolades, Dafoe and Maguire hold the Guinness World Record for "the longest career as a live-action Marvel character."

Notes

References

External links 
 
 
 Norman Osborn at the Marvel Cinematic Universe Wiki

Action film villains
Characters created by David Koepp
Experimental medical treatments in fiction
Fictional business executives
Fictional characters from New York City
Fictional characters with dissociative identity disorder
Fictional engineers
Fictional goblins
Fictional kidnappers
Fictional mass murderers
Fictional scientists in films
Fictional socialites
Fictional terrorists
Film and television memes
Film characters introduced in 2002
Film supervillains
Green Goblin
Marvel Cinematic Universe characters
Male film villains
Marvel Comics characters with superhuman strength
Marvel Comics scientists
Spider-Man (2002 film series)
Spider-Man film characters
Video game bosses